Tipula abdominalis, the giant crane fly, is a species of large crane flies in the family Tipulidae.

References

External links

Tipulidae
Articles created by Qbugbot